Glucogallin is chemical compound formed from gallic acid and β-D-glucose. It can be found in oaks species like the North American white oak (Quercus alba), European red oak (Quercus robur)  and Amla fruit (Phyllanthus emblica).

It is formed by a gallate 1-beta-glucosyltransferase (UDP-glucose: gallate glucosyltransferase), an enzyme performing the esterification of two substrates, UDP-glucose and gallate to yield two products, UDP and glucogallin. This enzyme can be found in oak leaf preparations.

This the first step in the biosynthesis of gallotannins. The molecule is then used by enzymes in the gallotannins synthetics pathway like beta-glucogallin O-galloyltransferase or beta-glucogallin-tetrakisgalloylglucose O-galloyltransferase.

β-Glucogallin is aldose reductase inhibitor.

Half-life of β-Glucogallin in human body seems to be unknown.

References 

Gallotannins